Donald C. Wunsch II is   Mary K. Finley Distinguished Professor of computer engineering at the Missouri University of Science and Technology, and a Fellow of the Institute of Electrical and Electronics Engineers He is known for his work on " hardware implementations, reinforcement and unsupervised learning".

Education 
Wunsch obtained a B.S. in Applied mathematics from the University of New Mexico  in 1984 ,  a M.S. in Applied mathematics from the University of Washington in 1987, and a Ph.D in electrical engineering, also from the University of Washington in 1991 with a thesis "An optoelectronic learning machine".  Later, in 2006, he obtained  an Executive MBA  from the  Washington University in St. Louis, Olin School of Business.

Career 
From 1984 to 1993 he worked for  Boeing, rising to the level of Senior Principal Scientist. In 1993 he joined Texas Tech University, as Assistant Professor with a joint appointment to the  Department of Electrical and Computer Engineering, and Computer Science.  In 1998, he was promoted to Associate Professor.

In 1999, he left Texas for the Missoouri University of Science and Technology, becoming  Mary K. Finley Distinguished Professor in the Department of Electrical and Computer Engineering, with courtesy appointments in the departments of System Engineering, Computer Science, and Business Administration.

Publications 
He is author or coauthor of:

 Lei Meng, Ah-Hwee Tan, and Donald C. Wunsch II, Adaptive Resonance Theory in Social Media Data Clustering,  Springer-Verlag, 2019. 
 Baydyk, T., Kussul, E., & Wunsch, D. C. (2019). Intelligent automation in renewable energy. Springer, 2019 
 Khalid Al-Jabery, Gayla Olbricht, Tayo Obafemi-Ajayi and Donald C. Wunsch II, Computational Learning Approaches to Data Analytics in Biomedical Applications,  Elsevier, 2019. 
 J. Sieffertt and D.C. Wunsch, Unified Computational Intelligence for Complex Systems: Studies in Neural, Economic and Social Dynamics. Springer-Verlag, 2010.  
 E. Kussul, T. Baidyk, and D.C. Wunsch II, Neural Networks in Micromechanics, Springer-Verlag, 2010.
 R. Xu and D.C. Wunsch II, Clustering. IEEE Press / Wiley, 2009. 
 Gorban, Alexander N., Balázs Kégl, Donald C. Wunsch, and Andrei Y. Zinovyev. 2008. Principal Manifolds for Data Visualization and Dimension Reduction. Springer 2008

The most highly cited of his papers, according to Google Scholar, are

 Prokhorov, D.V. and Wunsch, D.C., 1997. Adaptive critic designs. IEEE transactions on Neural Networks, 8(5), pp. 997–1007.  (cited 1182 times)
 Saad, Emad W., Danil V. Prokhorov, and Donald C. Wunsch. "Comparative study of stock trend prediction using time delay, recurrent and probabilistic neural networks." IEEE Transactions on neural networks 9.6 (1998): 1456-1470. (cited 578times)
 Li, Shuhui, Donald C. Wunsch, Edgar A. O'Hair, and Michael G. Giesselmann. "Using neural networks to estimate wind turbine power generation." IEEE Transactions on energy conversion 16, no. 3 (2001): 276-282. (cited 392 times)
 Xu, Rui, and Donald C. Wunsch. "Clustering algorithms in biomedical research: a review." IEEE reviews in biomedical engineering 3 (2010): 120-154.(cited 230 times)

Honors 
In 2005 he was President of the International Neural Networks Society, and in 2015 was a recipient of that society's  Gabor Award. .

He is a  Fellow of the IEEE, an INNS Senior Fellow, and Charles Hedlund Distinguished Visiting Professor at the  American University in Cairo.,

References

External links

20th-century births
Year of birth missing (living people)
Washington University in St. Louis alumni
University of Washington College of Engineering alumni
Texas Tech University faculty
Missouri University of Science and Technology faculty
Fellow Members of the IEEE
Living people